A matrix difference equation is a difference equation in which the value of a vector (or sometimes, a matrix) of variables at one point in time is related to its own value at one or more previous points in time, using matrices. The order of the equation is the maximum time gap between any two indicated values of the variable vector.  For example,

This equation is homogeneous because there is no vector constant term added to the end of the equation. The same equation might also be written as 

or as 

The most commonly encountered matrix difference equations are first-order.

Nonhomogeneous first-order case and the steady state

An example of a nonhomogeneous first-order matrix difference equation is

with additive constant vector .

where  is the  identity matrix, and where it is assumed that  is invertible.  Then the nonhomogeneous equation can be rewritten in homogeneous form in terms of deviations from the steady state:

Stability of the first-order case

The first-order matrix difference equation   is stable—that is,  converges asymptotically to the steady state —if and only if all eigenvalues of the transition matrix  (whether real or complex) have an absolute value which is less than 1.

Solution of the first-order case

Assume that the equation has been put in the homogeneous form . Then we can iterate and substitute repeatedly from the initial condition , which is the initial value of the vector  and which must be known in order to find the solution:

Further, if  is diagonalizable, we can rewrite  in terms of its eigenvalues and eigenvectors, giving the solution as

Extracting the dynamics of a single scalar variable from a first-order matrix system

Starting from the -dimensional system , we can extract the dynamics of one of the state variables, say .

where the parameters  are from the characteristic equation of the matrix :

Thus each individual scalar variable of an -dimensional first-order linear system evolves according to a univariate th-degree difference equation, which has the same stability property (stable or unstable) as does the matrix difference equation.

Solution and stability of higher-order cases

Matrix difference equations of higher order—that is, with a time lag longer than one period—can be solved, and their stability analyzed, by converting them into first-order form using a block matrix (matrix of matrices).  For example, suppose we have the second-order equation

This can be stacked in the form

Also as before, this stacked equation, and thus the original second-order equation, are stable if and only if all eigenvalues of the matrix  are smaller than unity in absolute value.

Nonlinear matrix difference equations: Riccati equations

This equation is called a discrete dynamic Riccati equation, and it arises when a variable vector evolving according to a linear matrix difference equation is controlled by manipulating an exogenous vector in order to optimize a quadratic cost function. This Riccati equation assumes the following, or a similar, form:

 

See here for details.

In most contexts the evolution of  backwards through time is stable, meaning that  converges to a particular fixed matrix  which may be irrational even if all the other matrices are rational. See also .

A related Riccati equation is

in which the matrices  are all . This equation can be solved explicitly. Then using this in the difference equation yields 

so by induction the form  holds for all .

Thus by induction

See also

Matrix differential equation
Difference equation
Linear difference equation
Dynamical system
Matrix Riccati equation#Mathematical description of the problem and solution

References

Linear algebra
Matrices
Recurrence relations
Dynamical systems